Bay of Angels is a 1963 French romantic drama film written and directed by Jacques Demy. Starring Jeanne Moreau and Claude Mann, it is Demy's second film and deals with the subject of gambling. The costumes were designed by Pierre Cardin.

Plot
Jean is a quiet young bank employee in Paris, living with his widowed father. After being taken to a casino by a colleague and winning at roulette, he decides to have a holiday on the south coast. His father warns him that gamblers always lose in the end, but the poison has entered his blood. In the casino at Nice he falls for Jackie, a brittle blonde fond of whisky, who has left husband and child to pursue her compulsion. Though she likes being with Jean, she warns him that she will sacrifice anything to keep on gambling, not for the money she claims but for the thrill. As her remaining belongings are in a suitcase at the railway station, where she plans to sleep, he offers her his hotel room. They drink, talk, and make love.

Back in the casino, the two win a fortune with which, having bought a sports car and smart clothes, they take a suite at Monte Carlo and hit the tables there. Losing everything, they take the train back to Nice, where Jean gets his father to send him some money. When this too is lost in the casino, Jean calls it a day and walks off, saying that he is going back to Paris. Hurt at this double rejection, of her and of their gambling partnership, Jackie angrily tells him to go. A moment later she runs after him and the two embrace in the sunset.

Cast
 Jeanne Moreau as Jacqueline "Jackie" Demaistre
  as Jean Fournier
 Paul Guers as Caron
 Henri Nassiet as Monsieur Fournier
 Conchita Parodi as the hotel manager
  as the bank director
  as Marthe

References

External links
 
 
 Review by The Village Voice
 Bay of Angels: Walking on Sand – an essay by Terrence Rafferty at The Criterion Collection

1963 films
1963 romantic drama films
1960s French films
1960s French-language films
Films about roulette
Films directed by Jacques Demy
Films scored by Michel Legrand
Films set in Nice
Films shot in Monaco
Films shot in Nice
Films shot in Paris
Films shot in Val-d'Oise
French black-and-white films
French romantic drama films